Pibocella is a Gram-negative heterotrophic and aerobic genus of bacteria from the family of Flavobacteriaceae with one known species Pibocella ponti. Pibocella ponti has been isolated from the alga Acrosiphonia sonderi.

References

Flavobacteria
Bacteria genera
Taxa described in 2005
Monotypic bacteria genera